Flight Pattern is a one-act contemporary ballet by Crystal Pite, set to the first movement of Henryk Górecki's Symphony No.3. It premiered at the Royal Opera House, London, on 16 March 2017, making Pite the first woman to choreograph for The Royal Ballet's main stage in 18 years. The ballet won the Laurence Olivier Award for Best New Dance Production.

In 2022, Pite expanded the ballet into Light of Passage, using the entirety of Górecki's Symphony No. 3, with Flight Pattern becoming the first part of the ballet.

Production

According to Pite, she started with choosing the music, which was the first movement of Henryk Górecki's Symphony No.3, also known as the Symphony of Sorrowful Songs. The symphony is believed to be Górecki's response to the Holocaust, which he had denied. Pite said when she listened to the music, she associated it with the European migrant crisis, for which she was "disappointed" with the international response, and on choreographing a ballet about the crisis, she said it was her "only way of coping with the world at the moment". 

Flight Pattern is performed by 36 dancers, with no principal dancers, but has a lead couple originated by Marcelino Sambé and Kristen McNally. (Sambé was promoted to principal in June 2019.) According to McNally, Pite did not know what ranks the dancers were, and chose the dancers she liked. Jay Gower Taylor and Nancy Bryant were brought to design the sets and costumes respectively.

Flight Pattern was most recently revived in May 2019, with McNally and Sambé reprising their roles. One of the performances was relayed in cinemas and released on a DVD.

Critical reviews
Flight Pattern received rave reviews. The Independent commented that "Pite’s skill and authority are remarkable, but her refugees are presented on a single tragic note." The Telegraph said "Pite’s marshalling of this huge ensemble is remarkable – never more than in the marginally more upbeat, expansive passage that seems to reflect the characters’ miraculously indefatigable optimism." The Guardian wrote that it is a "sombre and deeply affecting work", but noted Pite's style differ from The Royal Ballet's, and questioned "should the company be staging work whose style is so far removed from classical ballet?"

Awards and nominations

References

External links
Royal Opera House website

2017 ballet premieres
Ballets by Crystal Pite
Ballets created for The Royal Ballet
Ballets based on actual events
Works about the European migrant crisis